The 2008 Minnesota Twins season was the 48th season for the franchise in Minnesota, and the 108th overall in the American League. After tying the Chicago White Sox for first in the AL Central Division with an 88–74 record, the team lost a one game playoff to finish second and miss the league playoffs.

Offseason and spring training

Player and personnel moves 
General Manager for the previous 13 years, Terry Ryan stepped down into the role of Senior Advisor in September 2007 and was replaced by Bill Smith, formerly the assistant general manager. Scouting director Mike Radcliff was named vice president of player personnel and director of baseball operations Rob Antony was named assistant GM.

The offseason between the 2007 and 2008 seasons saw many rumors surrounding pitcher Johan Santana, but little action until shortly before the start of spring training. Typically standing still in the off-season, the Twins made some waves late November when they traded Matt Garza, Jason Bartlett and Eduardo Morlan to the Tampa Bay Rays for power-hitting outfielder Delmon Young, scrappy infielder Brendan Harris and former Twin Jason Pridie.

Prior to the Rays trade, the Twins traded for outfielder Craig Monroe of the Chicago Cubs. Monroe would later sign with the Twins and would be placed on the major league roster soon after. Monroe joined several others including Adam Everett and Mike Lamb as those new to the team who made the 2008 Opening Day roster.

On January 18, 2008, the Twins avoided arbitration with three current players: Jason Kubel, Justin Morneau and Juan Rincón. Rincón and Kubel were signed through 2008, while Morneau and Michael Cuddyer were signed to extended contracts.

The Twins also saw several players depart via free agency, roster management and trade. The Twins also released players Jason Tyner, Chris Heintz, Lew Ford, Josh Rabe and Matthew LeCroy.

Minnesota lost Carlos Silva via free agency, Silva signing with the Seattle Mariners for a four-year contract. Silva was a starting pitcher for the Twins in recent years after coming over in the Eric Milton trade.

The Twins also lost perennial Gold Glove center fielder and fan favorite Torii Hunter to free agency, who signed with the Los Angeles Angels of Anaheim for five years and $90 million.

The Twins traded ace Johan Santana to the New York Mets for four prospects: outfielder Carlos Gómez and pitchers Kevin Mulvey, Philip Humber and Deolis Guerra.

Spring training 
The Twins, as per long-standing tradition, were the last team to begin spring training on February 17, 2008.

On March 27, the Twins announced they had finished signing their entire 40-man roster.

Pitcher Francisco Liriano was unable to report to camp on time due to visa problems. Shortly before the start of the season, Liriano was sent down to the minor leagues to continue his development.

Gómez beat out center field prospects Denard Span and Jason Pridie for the starting job.

The team re-signed closer Joe Nathan to a four-year contract on March 24.

Regular season

Notable events 
On May 7, 2008, Carlos Gómez hit for the cycle against the Chicago White Sox at U.S. Cellular Field in Chicago. He became the ninth major leaguer in history to hit for the reverse natural cycle. He also became the third-youngest player to hit for the cycle in MLB history. It had been a spell of 22 years since the last Twin hit for the cycle, Kirby Puckett in 1986.

On May 19, Bobby Korecky—with a single in the tenth inning—became the only Twins pitcher to get a hit in the Metrodome (1982–2009).

In the third inning of the June 15 game against the Milwaukee Brewers, Scott Baker became the first Minnesota Twin to strike out four men in a single inning. After Ryan Braun struck out, Prince Fielder struck out swinging at a wild pitch and made it to first base. Baker then struck out Russell Branyan and Mike Cameron to end the inning. Baker is the eighth American League pitcher to strike out the four consecutively. In 2012, Francisco Liriano will become the second Twin to accomplish the feat.

During the 2008 campaign, the Twins sent three representatives to the 2008 MLB All Star game: Joe Mauer, Justin Morneau and Joe Nathan. Morneau went on to win the home run derby and score the winning run in the 15th inning of the All-Star game.

Joe Mauer won his second American League batting title with a .328 average. Justin Morneau set a new club record with 47 doubles, and led the major leagues playing in 163 games. Carlos Gómez topped Rod Carew's 1974 team record with 30 bunt singles (Carew had 29), a total which led the majors.

Joe Mauer and Justin Morneau both won Silver Slugger Awards; Mauer added a Gold Glove Award as well.

Season standings

Record vs. opponents

Game log 

|-  style="text-align:center; background:#bfb;"
| 1 || March 31 || Angels || 3 – 2 || Hernández (1-0)||Weaver (0-1) ||Nathan (1) ||49,596 || 1-0
|-  style="text-align:center; background:#fbb;"
| 2 || April 1 || Angels || 9 – 1||Garland (1-0)||Bonser (0-1) || || 24,586 || 1-1
|-  style="text-align:center; background:#fbb;"
| 3 || April 2 || Angels || 1 – 0 ||Saunders (1-0) ||Blackburn (0-1) ||Rodríguez (1) ||21,932 || 1-2
|-  style="text-align:center; background:#fbb;"
| 4 || April 3 || Angels || 5 – 4 || Santana (1-0) || Slowey (0-1) || Rodríguez (2) || 17,084 || 1-3
|-  style="text-align:center; background:#bfb;"
| 5 || April 4 || Royals ||4 – 3 ||Baker (1-0) ||Bale (0-1) ||Nathan (2) ||21,847 ||2-3
|-  style="text-align:center; background:#bfb;"
| 6 || April 5 || Royals ||6 – 4||Hernández (2-0) ||Meche (0-1) ||Nathan (3) ||21,262 ||3-3
|-  style="text-align:center; background:#fbb;"
| 7 || April 6 || Royals || 3 – 1 || Tomko (1-0) || Bonser (0-2) || Soria (3) || 21,765 || 3-4
|-  style="text-align:center; background:#fbb;"
| 8 || April 7 || @ White Sox || 7 – 4 || Vázquez (1-1) ||Guerrier (0-1) ||Jenks (4) || 38,082 || 3-5
|-  style="text-align:center; background:#bfb;"
| 9 || April 9 || @ White Sox || 12 – 5||Baker (2-0) || Danks (0-1)||Bass (1) ||16,499 || 4-5
|-  style="text-align:center; background:#bbb;"
| -- || April 10 || @ White Sox || colspan=6|Postponed (rain) Rescheduled for June 9
|-  style="text-align:center; background:#bfb;"
| 10 || April 11 || @ Royals || 5 – 0 || Hernández (3-0) || Meche (0-2) || || 16,691 || 5-5
|-  style="text-align:center; background:#bfb;"
| 11 || April 12 || @ Royals || 2 – 0 || Bonser (1-2) || Tomko (1-1) || Nathan (4) || 36,300 || 6-5
|-  style="text-align:center; background:#fbb;"
| 12 || April 13 || @ Royals || 5 – 1 || Bannister (3-0) || Liriano (0-1) || || 13,886 || 6-6
|-  style="text-align:center; background:#fbb;"
| 13 || April 14 || @ Tigers || 11 – 9 || Beltrán (1-0) || Neshek (0-1) || Jones (2) || 32,002 || 6-7
|-  style="text-align:center; background:#fbb;"
| 14 || April 15 || @ Tigers || 6 – 5 || Rapada (1-0) || Crain (0-1) || Jones (3) || 30,901 || 6-8
|-  style="text-align:center; background:#bfb;"
| 15 || April 16 || Rays ||6 – 5 || Rincón (1-0)|| Wheeler (0-2) || Nathan (5)|| 20,209 ||7-8
|-  style="text-align:center; background:#fbb;"
| 16 || April 17 || Rays ||7 – 3 || Hammel (1-1)|| Bonser (1-3)|| Howell (1) ||14,781||7-9
|-  style="text-align:center; background:#fbb;"
| 17 || April 18 || Indians || 4 – 0 || Lee (3-0) || Liriano (0-2) || || 22,366 || 7-10
|-  style="text-align:center; background:#bfb;"
| 18 || April 19 || Indians || 3 – 0 || Blackburn (1-1) || Westbrook (1-2) || Nathan (6) || 34,210 || 8-10
|-  style="text-align:center; background:#bfb;"
| 19 || April 20 || Indians || 2 – 1 (10) || Guerrier (1-1) || Pérez (0-1) || || 27,703 || 9-10
|-  style="text-align:center; background:#bfb;"
| 20 || April 22 || @ Athletics || 5 – 4 || Rincón (2-0) || Blanton (1-4) || Nathan (7) || 10,267 || 10-10
|-  style="text-align:center; background:#fbb;"
| 21 || April 23 || @ Athletics || 3 – 0 || Gaudin (2-1) || Bonser (1-4) || Street (6) || 15,242 || 10-11
|-  style="text-align:center; background:#fbb;"
| 22 || April 24 || @ Athletics || 11 – 2 || Smith (2-0) || Liriano (0-3) || || 12,593 || 10-12
|-  style="text-align:center; background:#fbb;"
| 23 || April 25 || @ Rangers || 6 – 5 (10) ||Benoit (2-1) ||Rincón (2-1) || || 19,016 || 10-13
|-  style="text-align:center; background:#bfb;"
| 24 || April 26 || @ Rangers || 12 – 6 || Reyes (1-0) || Wright (1-1) || || 33,053 || 11-13
|-  style="text-align:center; background:#fbb;"
| 25 || April 27 || @ Rangers || 10 – 0 || Padilla (3-2) || Hernández (3-1) || || 19,911 || 11-14
|-  style="text-align:center; background:#bfb;"
| 26 || April 29 || White Sox || 3 – 1 || Bonser (2-4) || Floyd (2-1) || Nathan (8) || 20,891 || 12-14
|-  style="text-align:center; background:#bfb;"
| 27 || April 30 || White Sox || 4 – 3 || Blackburn (2-1) || Wassermann (0-1)|| Nathan (9) || 19,137 || 13-14
|-

|-  style="text-align:center; background:#bfb;"
| 28 || May 2 || Tigers || 11 – 1 || Hernández (4-1) || Galarraga (2-1) || || 33,628 || 14-14
|-  style="text-align:center; background:#bfb;"
| 29 || May 3 || Tigers || 4 – 1 || Bass (1-0) || Verlander (1-5) || Nathan (10) || 28,985 || 15-14
|-  style="text-align:center; background:#bfb;"
| 30 || May 4 || Tigers || 7 – 6 || Guerrier (2-1) || Miner (1-2) || Nathan (11) || 29,821 || 16-14
|-  style="text-align:center; background:#fbb;"
| 31 || May 6 || @ White Sox || 7 – 1 || Floyd (3-1) || Blackburn (2-2) || || 23,480 || 16-15
|-  style="text-align:center; background:#bfb;"
| 32 || May 7 || @ White Sox || 13 – 1 || Hernández (5-1) || Buehrle (1-4) || || 21,092 || 17-15
|-  style="text-align:center; background:#fbb;"
| 33 || May 8 || @ White Sox || 6 – 2 || Danks (3-3) || Slowey (0-2) || || 25,193 || 17-16
|-  style="text-align:center; background:#bfb;"
| 34 || May 9 || Red Sox || 7 – 6 || Crain (1-1) || Papelbon (2-2) || || 25,477 || 18-16
|-  style="text-align:center; background:#fbb;"
| 35 || May 10 || Red Sox || 5 – 2 || Matsuzaka (6-0) || Perkins (0-1) || Papelbon (11) || 33,839 || 18-17
|-  style="text-align:center; background:#bfb;"
| 36 || May 11 || Red Sox || 9 – 8 || Blackburn (3-2) || Wakefield (3-2) || Nathan (12) || 26,511 || 19-17
|-  style="text-align:center; background:#bfb;"
| 37 || May 12 || Red Sox || 7 – 3 || Hernández (6-1) || Bucholz (2-3)|| || 18,782 || 20-17
|-  style="text-align:center; background:#fbb;"
| 38 || May 13 || Blue Jays || 5 – 3 || Litsch (5-1) || Slowey (0-3) || Ryan (6) || 18,110 || 20-18
|-  style="text-align:center; background:#fbb;"
| 39 || May 14 || Blue Jays || 6 – 5 || Halladay (4-5) || Bonser (2-5) || Downs (5) || 21,026 || 20-19
|-  style="text-align:center; background:#fbb;"
| 40 || May 15 || Blue Jays || 3 – 2 (11) || Camp (1-1)|| Crain (1-2)|| Ryan (7) || 18,701 || 20-20
|-  style="text-align:center; background:#bfb;"
| 41 || May 16 || @ Rockies || 4 – 2 || Blackburn (4-2) || Jiménez (1-4) || Nathan (13) || 35,336 || 21-20
|-  style="text-align:center; background:#fbb;"
| 42 || May 17 || @ Rockies || 3 – 2 || Herges (2-0) || Hernández (6-2) || Fuentes (5) || 43,149 || 21-21
|-  style="text-align:center; background:#fbb;"
| 43 || May 18 || @ Rockies || 6 – 2 || Francis (1-4) || Slowey (0-4) || || 40,326 || 21-22
|-  style="text-align:center; background:#bfb;"
| 44 || May 19 || Rangers ||7 – 6 (12)||Korecky (1-0)||Germán (1-3)|| || 16,680 || 22-22
|-  style="text-align:center; background:#bfb;"
| 45 || May 20 || Rangers ||11 – 4 ||Perkins (1-1)||Mathis (1-1)|| ||19,376||23-22
|-  style="text-align:center; background:#fbb;"
| 46 || May 21 || Rangers ||10 – 1||Ponson (3-0)||Blackburn (4-3)|| ||22,032||23-23
|-  style="text-align:center; background:#fbb;"
| 47 || May 22 || Rangers ||8 – 7 (10)||Benoit (3-1)|| Bass (1-1) || Wilson (9) || 23,126 || 23-24
|-  style="text-align:center; background:#bfb;"
| 48 || May 23 || @ Tigers || 9 – 4 || Slowey (1-4) || Galarraga (3-2) || || 40,732 || 24-24
|-  style="text-align:center; background:#fbb;"
| 49 || May 24 || @ Tigers || 19 – 3 || Robertson (2-4) || Bonser (2-6) || || 41,137 || 24-25
|-  style="text-align:center; background:#bfb;"
| 50 || May 25 || @ Tigers || 6 – 1 || Perkins (2-1) || Cruceta (0-2) || || 42,413 || 25-25
|-  style="text-align:center; background:#bfb;"
| 51 || May 27 || @ Royals || 4 – 3 (12) || Crain (2-2) || Núñez (3-1) || Guerrier (1) || 17,191 || 26-25
|-  style="text-align:center; background:#bfb;"
| 52 || May 28 || @ Royals || 9 – 8 (10) || Crain (3-2) || Peralta (0-2) || Nathan (14) || 13,621 || 27-25
|-  style="text-align:center; background:#bfb;"
| 53 || May 29 || @ Royals || 5 – 1 || Slowey (2-4) || Hochevar (3-5) || || 12,336 || 28-25
|-  style="text-align:center; background:#fbb;"
| 54 || May 30 || Yankees || 6 – 5 || Mussina (8-4) || Perkins (2-2) || Rivera (14) || 30,188 || 28-26
|-  style="text-align:center; background:#fbb;"
| 55 || May 31 || Yankees || 7 – 6 (12) || Ohlendorf (1-1) || Rincón (2-2) || Rivera (15) || 36,441 || 28-27
|-

|-  style="text-align:center; background:#bfb;"
| 56 || June 1 || Yankees || 5 – 1 || Bass (2-1)|| Rasner (3-2) || || 27,479 || 29-27
|-  style="text-align:center; background:#bfb;"
| 57 || June 2 || Yankees || 6 – 5 ||Guerrier (3-1)||Farnsworth (0-2)||Nathan (15)||20,168||30-27
|-  style="text-align:center; background:#fbb;"
| 58 || June 3 || Orioles || 5 – 3 ||Liz (1-0)||Slowey (2-5)||Sherrill (19)||18,802||30-28
|-  style="text-align:center; background:#bfb;"
| 59 || June 4 || Orioles || 7 – 5 ||Bonser (3-6)||Cabrera (5-2)||Nathan (16)||22,057||31-28
|-  style="text-align:center; background:#fbb;"
| 60 || June 5 || Orioles || 3 – 2 ||Olson (5-2)||Bass (2-2)||Sherrill (20)||19,621||31-29
|-  style="text-align:center; background:#fbb;"
| 61 || June 6 || @ White Sox || 10 – 6 ||Vázquez (6-4)||Blackburn (4-4)|| ||26,459||31-30
|-  style="text-align:center; background:#fbb;"
| 62 || June 7 || @ White Sox || 11 – 2 ||Buehrle (3-6)||Hernández (6-3)|| ||32,930||31-31
|-  style="text-align:center; background:#fbb;"
| 63 || June 8 || @ White Sox || 12 – 2 ||Floyd (7-3)||Slowey (2-6)|| ||30,565||31-32
|-  style="text-align:center; background:#fbb;"
| 64 || June 9 || @ White Sox || 7 – 5 ||Thornton (2-1)||Guerrier (3-2)||Jenks (15)||21,126||31-33
|-  style="text-align:center; background:#fbb;"
| 65 || June 10 || @ Indians || 1 – 0 ||Sabathia (4-8)||Baker (2-1)|| ||26,874||31-34
|-  style="text-align:center; background:#bfb;"
| 66 || June 11 || @ Indians || 8 – 5 ||Blackburn (5-4)||Byrd (3-6)||Nathan (17)||18,742||32-34
|-  style="text-align:center; background:#fbb;"
| 67 || June 12 || @ Indians || 12 – 2 ||Laffey (4-3)||Hernández (6-4)|| ||21,716||32-35
|-  style="text-align:center; background:#bfb;"
| 68 || June 13 || @ Brewers || 10 – 2 ||Slowey (3-6)||Bush (2-7)|| ||38,586||33-35
|-  style="text-align:center; background:#bfb;"
| 69 || June 14 || @ Brewers || 9 – 4 (12) ||Bass (3-2)||Tavárez (0-2)|| ||43,812||34-35
|-  style="text-align:center; background:#fbb;"
| 70 || June 15 || @ Brewers || 4 – 2 ||McClung (4-3)||Baker (2-2)||Torres (8)||41,693||34-36
|-  style="text-align:center; background:#bfb;"
| 71 || June 17 || Nationals || 2 – 1 ||Hernández (7-4)||Lannan (4-8)||Nathan (18)||20,920||35-36
|-  style="text-align:center; background:#bfb;"
| 72 || June 18 || Nationals || 11 – 2 ||Slowey (4-6) || Bergmann (1-5) || || 23,841 || 36-36
|-  style="text-align:center; background:#bfb;"
| 73 || June 19 || Nationals || 9 – 3 ||Perkins (3-2) || Hill (1-4) || || 24,793 || 37-36
|-  style="text-align:center; background:#bfb;"
| 74 || June 20 || D-backs || 7 – 2 || Baker (3-2) || Johnson (4-5) || || 29,069 || 38-36
|-  style="text-align:center; background:#bfb;"
| 75 || June 21 || D-backs || 6 – 1 || Blackburn (6-4) || Owings (6-6) || || 25,505 || 39-36
|-  style="text-align:center; background:#bfb;"
| 76 || June 22 || D-backs || 5 – 3 || Hernández (8-4) || Webb (11-4) || Nathan (19) || 31,497 || 40-36
|-  style="text-align:center; background:#bfb;"
| 77 || June 24 || @ Padres || 3 – 1 || Reyes (2-0) || Hoffman (1-5) || Nathan (20) || 36,948 || 41-36
|-  style="text-align:center; background:#bfb;"
| 78 || June 25 || @ Padres || 9 – 3 || Perkins (4-2) || Maddux (3-6) || || 22,324 || 42-36
|-  style="text-align:center; background:#bfb;"
| 79 || June 26 || @ Padres || 4 – 3 || Baker (4-2) || Banks (2-2) || Nathan (21) || 28,789 || 43-36
|-  style="text-align:center; background:#bfb;"
| 80 || June 27 || Brewers || 7 – 6 || Guerrier (4-2) || Mota (2-5) || Nathan (22) || 30,104 || 44-36
|-  style="text-align:center; background:#fbb;"
| 81 || June 28 || Brewers || 5 – 1 || Parra (8-2) || Hernández (8-5) || || 38,963 || 44-37
|-  style="text-align:center; background:#bfb;"
| 82 || June 29 || Brewers || 5 – 0 || Slowey (5-6) || Sheets (9-2)|| || 30,655 || 45-37
|-  style="text-align:center; background:#fbb;"
| 83 || June 30 || Tigers || 5 – 4 || Fossum (1-0) || Guerrier (4-3) || Zumaya (1) || 22,196 || 45-38
|-

|-  style="text-align:center; background:#bfb;"
| 84 || July 1 || Tigers || 6 – 4 || Baker (5-2)|| Robertson (6-7)|| Nathan (23) || 23,754 || 46-38
|-  style="text-align:center; background:#bfb;"
| 85 || July 2 || Tigers || 7 – 0 || Blackburn (7-4)|| Bonine (2-1)|| || 30,102 || 47-38
|-  style="text-align:center; background:#bfb;"
| 86 || July 4 || Indians || 12 – 3 || Hernández (9-5)|| Byrd (3-10) || || 22,634 || 48-38
|-  style="text-align:center; background:#bfb;"
| 87 || July 5 || Indians || 9 – 6 || Slowey (6-6) || Mastny (0-2)|| Nathan (24)|| 31,887 || 49-38
|-  style="text-align:center; background:#bfb;"
| 88 || July 6 || Indians || 4 – 3 || Perkins (5-2) || Lee (11-2) || Nathan (25)|| 30,258 || 50-38
|-  style="text-align:center; background:#fbb;"
| 89 || July 7 || @ Red Sox || 1 – 0 || Okajima (2-2) || Bass (3-3) || Papelbon (26) || 37,912 || 50-39
|-  style="text-align:center; background:#fbb;"
| 90 || July 8 || @ Red Sox || 6 – 5 || Aardsma (3-2) || Guerrier (4-4) || Papelbon (27) || 37,925 || 50-40
|-  style="text-align:center; background:#fbb;"
| 91 || July 9 || @ Red Sox || 18 – 5 || Beckett (9-5) || Hernández (9-6) || || 37,470 || 50-41
|-  style="text-align:center; background:#bfb;"
| 92 || July 10 || @ Tigers || 7 – 6 (11) || Guerrier (5-4) || Dolsi (1-3) || || 41,952 || 51-41
|-  style="text-align:center; background:#bfb;"
| 93 || July 11 || @ Tigers || 3 – 2 || Perkins (6-2) || Galarraga (7-3) || Nathan (26) || 42,352 || 52-41
|-  style="text-align:center; background:#bfb;"
| 94 || July 12 || @ Tigers || 6 – 5 || Baker (6-2) || Robertson (6-8) || Nathan (27) || 41,301 || 53-41
|-  style="text-align:center; background:#fbb;"
| 95 || July 13 || @ Tigers || 4 – 2 || Verlander (7–9) || Blackburn (7-5)|| Jones (17) || 41,453 || 53-42
|-  style="text-align:center; background:#bfb;"
| 96 || July 18 || Rangers || 6 – 0 || Perkins (7-2) || Millwood (6-6) || || 30,134 || 54-42
|-  style="text-align:center; background:#bfb;"
| 97 || July 19 || Rangers || 14 – 2 || Hernández (10-6) || Harrison (1-1) || || 35,085 || 55-42
|-  style="text-align:center; background:#fbb;"
| 98 || July 20 || Rangers || 1 – 0 || Padilla (11-5) || Baker (6-3) || Wilson (22) || 36,029 || 55-43
|-  style="text-align:center; background:#fbb;"
| 99 || July 21 || @ Yankees || 12 – 4 || Ponson (6-1)|| Blackburn (7-6) || ||53,484 || 55-44
|-  style="text-align:center; background:#fbb;"
| 100 || July 22 || @ Yankees || 8 – 2 || Robertson (2-0)|| Slowey (6-7)|| ||53,406|| 55-45
|-  style="text-align:center; background:#fbb;"
| 101 || July 23 || @ Yankees || 5 – 1 || Mussina (13-6)|| Perkins (7-3)||Rivera (25)|| 54,114 || 55-46
|-  style="text-align:center; background:#fbb;"
| 102 || July 25 || @ Indians || 5 – 4 || Lee (14-2) || Hernández (10-7) ||Pérez (1) || 33,512 || 55-47
|-  style="text-align:center; background:#bfb;"
| 103 || July 26 || @ Indians || 11 – 4 || Baker (7-3) || Carmona (4-3) || || 35,390 || 56-47
|-  style="text-align:center; background:#bfb;"
| 104 || July 27 || @ Indians || 4 – 2 || Guerrier (6-4) || Perez (1-2) || Nathan (28) || 31,562 || 57-47
|-  style="text-align:center; background:#bfb;"
| 105 || July 28 || White Sox || 7 – 0 || Slowey (7-7) || Buehrle (8-9) || || 30,126 || 58-47
|-  style="text-align:center; background:#bfb;"
| 106 || July 29 || White Sox || 6 – 5 || Perkins (8-3) || Richard (0-1) ||Nathan (29) || 35,999 || 59-47
|-  style="text-align:center; background:#fbb;"
| 107 || July 30 || White Sox || 8 – 3 || Floyd (11-6) || Hernández (10-8) || || 42,705 || 59-48
|-  style="text-align:center; background:#bfb;"
| 108 || July 31 || White Sox || 10 – 6 ||Crain (4-2) ||Thornton (4-3) || ||31,493||60-48
|-

|-  style="text-align:center; background:#bfb;"
| 109 || August 1 || Indians || 4 – 1 || Blackburn (8-6) || Sowers (1-6) || Nathan (30) || 33,709 || 61-48
|-  style="text-align:center; background:#fbb;"
| 110 || August 2 || Indians || 5 – 1 || Byrd (6-10) || Slowey (7-8) || || 40,937 || 61-49
|-  style="text-align:center; background:#bfb;"
| 111 || August 3 || Indians || 6 – 2 || Liriano (1-3) || Ginter (1-3) || || 39,818 || 62-49
|-  style="text-align:center; background:#fbb;"
| 112 || August 4 || @ Mariners || 11 – 6 || Corcoran (2-0) || Bass (3-4) || || 27,758 || 62-50
|-  style="text-align:center; background:#fbb;"
| 113 || August 5 || @ Mariners || 8 – 7 || Putz (4-4) || Guerrier (6-5) || || 26,083 || 62-51
|-  style="text-align:center; background:#bfb;"
| 114 || August 6 || @ Mariners || 7 – 3 || Blackburn (9-6) || Washburn (5-11) || || 30,441 || 63-51
|-  style="text-align:center; background:#bfb;"
| 115 || August 8 || @ Royals || 4 – 1 || Slowey (8-8) || Davies (5-3) || Nathan (31) || 33,653 || 64-51
|-  style="text-align:center; background:#bfb;"
| 116 || August 9 || @ Royals || 7 – 3 || Liriano (2-3) || Greinke (9-8) || || 27,960 || 65-51
|-  style="text-align:center; background:#fbb;"
| 117 || August 10 || @ Royals || 5 – 4 (12)||Tejeda (1-2) ||Breslow (0-1)|| || 23,163 || 65-52
|-  style="text-align:center; background:#bfb;"
| 118 || August 11 || Yankees || 4 – 0 ||Perkins (9-3) ||Ponson (7-3) || || 30,126 || 66-52
|-  style="text-align:center; background:#fbb;"
| 119 || August 12 || Yankees || 9 – 6 (12) || Veras (3-1) || Guerrier (6-6) || E. Ramírez (1) || 33,036 || 66-53
|-  style="text-align:center; background:#bfb;"
| 120 || August 13 || Yankees || 4 – 2 || Slowey (9-8) || Rasner (5-9) || Nathan (32) || 35,187 || 67-53
|-  style="text-align:center; background:#bfb;"
| 121 || August 15 || Mariners || 9 – 3 || Liriano (3-3) || Silva (4-14) || || 32,208 || 68-53
|-  style="text-align:center; background:#bfb;"
| 122 || August 16 || Mariners || 7 – 6 || Reyes (3-0) || Jiménez (0-2) || || 36,316 || 69-53
|-  style="text-align:center; background:#bfb;"
| 123 || August 17 || Mariners || 11 – 8 || Perkins (10-3) || Feierabend (0-1) || Nathan (33) || 35,478 || 70-53
|-  style="text-align:center; background:#fbb;"
| 124 || August 18 || Athletics || 3 – 2 || Saarloos (1-0) || Blackburn (9-7) || Ziegler (3) || 25,024 || 70-54
|-  style="text-align:center; background:#bfb;"
| 125 || August 19 || Athletics || 13 – 2 || Slowey (10-8) || Gallagher (4-6) || || 35,256 || 71-54
|-  style="text-align:center; background:#bfb;"
| 126 || August 20 || Athletics || 3 – 1 || Liriano (4-3) || Braden (3-3) || Nathan (34) || 30,888 || 72-54
|-  style="text-align:center; background:#bfb;"
| 127 || August 21 || @ Angels || 2 – 1 (12) || Crain (5-2) || Speier (1-7) || Nathan (35) || 41,367 || 73-54
|-  style="text-align:center; background:#bfb;"
| 128 || August 22 || @ Angels || 9 – 0 || Perkins (11-3) ||Saunders (14-6) || || 43,819 || 74-54
|-  style="text-align:center; background:#fbb;"
| 129 || August 23 || @ Angels || 7 – 5 || Oliver (5-1) ||Blackburn (9-8) ||Rodríguez (49) || 43,906 || 74-55
|-  style="text-align:center; background:#fbb;"
| 130 || August 24 || @ Angels || 5 – 3 || Arredondo (6-1) ||Crain (5-3)|| Rodríguez (50) || 40,011 || 74-56
|-  style="text-align:center; background:#fbb;"
| 131 || August 25 || @ Mariners || 4 – 2 (11) || Dickey (4-8) ||Crain (5-4) || || 23,277 || 74-57
|-  style="text-align:center; background:#fbb;"
| 132 || August 26 || @ Mariners || 3 – 2 || Rowland-Smith (3-2) ||Baker (7-4)||Corcoran (1) || 26,292 || 74-58
|-  style="text-align:center; background:#bfb;"
| 133 || August 27 || @ Mariners || 6 – 5 || Perkins (12-3) ||Green (3-4) ||Nathan (36) || 23,581 || 75-58
|-  style="text-align:center; background:#fbb;"
| 134 || August 28 || @ Athletics || 3 – 2 || Devine (4-0) ||Breslow (0-2) || || 12,357 || 75-59
|-  style="text-align:center; background:#bfb;"
| 135 || August 29 || @ Athletics || 12 – 2 || Slowey (11-8) ||Meyer (0-3) ||Breslow (1) || 22,355 || 76-59
|-  style="text-align:center; background:#fbb;"
| 136 || August 30 || @ Athletics || 3 – 2 || Street (5-5) || Nathan (0-1) || || 25,238 || 76-60
|-  style="text-align:center; background:#bfb;"
| 137 || August 31 || @ Athletics || 12 – 4 || Baker (8-4) || Smith (6-14) || || 18,427 || 77-60
|-

|-  style="text-align:center; background:#fbb;"
| 138 || September 2 || @ Blue Jays || 7 – 5 || Carlson (5-1) || Bonser (3-7) || Ryan (26)|| 21,254 || 77-61
|-  style="text-align:center; background:#fbb;"
| 139 || September 3 || @ Blue Jays || 5 – 4 (11) || Carlson (6-1) || Guardado (3-4)|| || 21,475 || 77-62
|-  style="text-align:center; background:#fbb;"
| 140 || September 4 || @ Blue Jays|| 9 – 0 || Litsch (10-8) || Slowey (11-9) || || 25,128 || 77-63
|-  style="text-align:center; background:#bfb;"
| 141 || September 5 || Tigers || 10 – 2 || Liriano (5-3) || Galarraga (12-5) || || 24,424 || 78-63
|-  style="text-align:center; background:#fbb;"
| 142 || September 6 || Tigers || 6 – 4 || Rapada (3-0) || Guerrier (6-7) || Rodney (9) || 42,606 || 78-64
|-  style="text-align:center; background:#fbb;"
| 143 || September 7 || Tigers || 7 – 5 || Lambert (1-1) || Perkins (12-4) || Rodney (10) || 31,236 || 78-65
|-  style="text-align:center; background:#bfb;"
| 144 || September 9 || Royals || 7 – 2 || Blackburn (10-8) || Bannister (7-15) || || 17,015 || 79-65
|-  style="text-align:center; background:#bfb;"
| 145 || September 10 || Royals || 7 – 1 || Slowey (12-9) || Davies (6-7) || || 20,421 || 80-65
|-  style="text-align:center; background:#fbb;"
| 146 || September 11 || Royals || 3 – 2 (10) || R. Ramírez (3-2) || Guerrier (6-8) || Soria (36) || 20,138 || 80-66
|-  style="text-align:center; background:#bbb;"
| -- || September 12 || @ Orioles || colspan=6|Postponed (rain) Rescheduled for September 13
|-  style="text-align:center; background:#bfb;"
| 147 || September 13 || @ Orioles || 12 – 2 || Baker (9-4) || Cabrera (8-10) || || || 81-66
|-  style="text-align:center; background:#bfb;"
| 148 || September 13 || @ Orioles || 12 – 6 || Korecky (2-0) || Olson (9-8) || || 21,712 || 82-66
|-  style="text-align:center; background:#fbb;"
| 149 || September 14 || @ Orioles || 7 – 3 || Liz (6-5) || Blackburn (10-9) || || 18,559 ||82-67
|-  style="text-align:center; background:#fbb;"
| 150 || September 15 || @ Indians || 3 – 1 || S. Lewis (2-0) || Slowey (12-10) ||J. Lewis (9) || 19,607 || 82-68
|-  style="text-align:center; background:#fbb;"
| 151 || September 16 || @ Indians || 12 – 9 (11) || Mastny (2-2) || Nathan (0-2) || || 21,295 || 82-69
|-  style="text-align:center; background:#fbb;"
| 152 || September 17 || @ Indians || 6 – 4 || Mujica (3-2) || Mijares (0-1) || Lewis (10) || 22,904 || 82-70
|-  style="text-align:center; background:#bfb;"
| 153 || September 18 || @ Rays || 11 – 8 || Guardado (4-4) || Wheeler (5-6) || Nathan (37) || 17,296 || 83-70
|-  style="text-align:center; background:#fbb;"
| 154 || September 19 || @ Rays || 11 – 1 || Jackson (12-11) || Blackburn (10-10) || || 28,306 || 83-71
|-  style="text-align:center; background:#fbb;"
| 155 || September 20 || @ Rays || 7 – 2 || Kazmir (12-7) || Slowey (12-11) || || 36,048 || 83-72
|-  style="text-align:center; background:#bfb;"
| 156 || September 21 || @ Rays || 4 – 1 || Liriano (6-3) || Sonnanstine (13-8) || Nathan (38) || 36,048 || 84-72
|-  style="text-align:center; background:#bfb;"
| 157 || September 23 || White Sox || 9 – 3 || Baker (10-4) || Vasquez (12-15) || || 35,225 ||85-72
|-  style="text-align:center; background:#bfb;"
| 158 || September 24 || White Sox || 3 – 2 ||Blackburn (11-10) ||Burhrle (14-12) ||Nathan (39) || 42,126 ||86-72
|-  style="text-align:center; background:#bfb;"
| 159 || September 25 || White Sox || 7 – 6 (10) ||Nathan (1-2)||Jenks (3-1)|| || 43,601 ||87-72
|-  style="text-align:center; background:#fbb;"
| 160 || September 26 || Royals || 8 – 1 || Davies (9-7) || Liriano (6-4) || || 30,674 || 87-73
|-  style="text-align:center; background:#fbb;"
| 161 || September 27 || Royals || 4 – 2 || Meche (14-11) || Guerrier (6-9) || Soria (42) || 38,072 || 87-74
|-  style="text-align:center; background:#bfb;"
| 162 || September 28 || Royals || 6 – 0 || Baker (11-4) || Duckworth (3-3) || || 42,942 || 88-74
|-  style="text-align:center; background:#fbb;"
| 163 || September 30 || @ White Sox* || 1 – 0 || Danks (12-9) || Blackburn (11-11) || Jenks (30) || 40,354 || 88-75
|-

Roster

Regular season transactions 

April 5, 2008: Placed outfielder Michael Cuddyer on the 15-day disabled list; recalled outfielder Denard Span from Rochester of the International League (AAA).

April 11, 2008: Placed pitcher Kevin Slowey on the 15-day disabled list, retroactive to April 4.

April 12, 2008: Recalled pitcher Francisco Liriano from Rochester.

April 19, 2008: Placed shortstop Adam Everett on the 15-day disabled list, retroactive to April 15; recalled third baseman Brian Buscher from Rochester.

April 24, 2008: Optioned outfielder Denard Span to Rochester of the International League (AAA).

April 25, 2008: Activated outfielder Michael Cuddyer from the 15-day disabled list.

April 26, 2008: Optioned pitcher Francisco Liriano to Rochester of the International League (AAA); recalled pitcher Bobby Korecky from Rochester.

April 30, 2008: Optioned third baseman Brian Buscher to Rochester of the International League (AAA).

May 2, 2008: Activated infielder Adam Everett from the 15-day disabled list.

May 8, 2008: Placed pitcher Scott Baker on the 15-day disabled list, retroactive to May 4; activated pitcher Kevin Slowey from the 15-day disabled list.

May 9, 2008: Placed pitcher Pat Neshek on the 15-day disabled list; recalled pitcher Glen Perkins from Rochester.

May 11, 2008: Placed infielder Nick Punto on the 15-day disabled list; recalled infielder Alexi Casilla from Rochester.

May 17, 2008: Placed infielder Matt Tolbert on the 15-day disabled list; purchased the contract of infielder Howie Clark from Rochester.

May 22, 2008: Placed shortstop Adam Everett on the 15-day disabled list; recalled infielder Matt Macri from Rochester.

May 29, 2008: Claimed pitcher Craig Breslow off waivers from the Cleveland Indians; transferred pitcher Pat Neshek to the 60-day disabled list; optioned pitcher Bobby Korecky to Rochester.

May 31, 2008: Activated infielder Nick Punto from the 15-day disabled list; designated infielder Howie Clark for assignment.

June 2, 2008: Outrighted infielder Howie Clark to the minor leagues.

June 5, 2008: Optioned infielder Matt Macri to Rochester of the International League (AAA).

June 6, 2008: Activated pitcher Scott Baker from the 15-day disabled list; placed infielder Nick Punto on the 15-day disabled list; recalled infielder Matt Macri from Rochester.

June 13, 2008: Pitcher Juan Rincón designated for assignment; recalled infielder Brian Buscher from Rochester.

June 18, 2008: Released pitcher Juan Rincón.

June 24, 2008: Activated infielder Nick Punto from the 15-day disabled list: optioned infielder Howie Clark to Rochester.

June 29, 2008: Placed outfielder Michael Cuddyer on the 15-day disabled list, retroactive to June 28; recalled outfielder Denard Span from Rochester of the International League (AAA).

July 31, 2008: Placed infielder Alexi Casilla on the 15-day disabled list; activated infielder Adam Everett from the 15-day disabled list.

August 1, 2008: Designated pitcher Liván Hernández and outfielder Craig Monroe for assignment; recalled pitcher Francisco Liriano from Rochester; purchased the contract of infielder Randy Ruiz from Rochester.

August 11, 2008: Signed former Twin Bobby Kielty to a minor league contract.

August 21, 2008: Activated infielder Alexi Casilla from the 15-day disabled list; assigned pitcher Brian Bass to Rochester of the International League (AAA).

Player stats

Batting 
Note: G = Games played; AB = At bats; R = Runs scored; H = Hits; 2B = Doubles; 3B = Triples; HR = Home runs; RBI = Runs batted in; AVG = Batting average; SB = Stolen bases

Pitching 
Note: W = Wins; L = Losses; ERA = Earned run average; G = Games pitched; GS = Games started; SV = Saves; IP = Innings pitched; R = Runs allowed; ER = Earned runs allowed; BB = Walks allowed; K = Strikeouts

Other post-season awards 
 Calvin R. Griffith Award (Most Valuable Twin) – Justin Morneau
 Joseph W. Haynes Award (Twins Pitcher of the Year) – Joe Nathan
 Bill Boni Award (Twins Outstanding Rookie) – Denard Span
 Charles O. Johnson Award (Most Improved Twin) – Alexi Casilla
 Dick Siebert Award (Upper Midwest Player of the Year) – Joe Mauer
 Bob Allison Award (Leadership Award) – Justin Morneau
 Mike Augustin Award ("Media Good Guy" Award) – Joe Nathan
 The above awards are voted on by the Twin Cities chapter of the BBWAA
 Carl R. Pohlad Award (Outstanding Community Service) – Joe Mauer
 Sherry Robertson Award (Twins Outstanding Farm System Position Player) – Ben Revere
 Jim Rantz Award (Twins Outstanding Farm System Pitcher) – Anthony Slama
 Kirby Puckett Award (Alumni Community Service) – Kent Hrbek
 Herb Carneal Award (Lifetime Achievement Award) – Carl Pohlad

Farm system 

LEAGUE CHAMPIONS: Elizabethton

References

External links 

 2008 Minnesota Twins at Baseball Reference
 Minnesota Twins on FoxSports.com
 Twins clubhouse on ESPN.com

Minnesota Twins seasons
Minnesota Twins
2008 in sports in Minnesota